5 Rue Christine (also known as 5RC) is a semi-defunct Olympia, Washington based independent record label, formed as a spin-off from the Kill Rock Stars label in 1997.  Before its dormancy, it had become a premier label for experimental rock bands. In 2007 5RC released its final record.

Bands
 The Advantage
 Amps for Christ
 BARR
 Deerhoof
 Excepter
 Hella
 Inca Ore
 The Mae Shi
 Marnie Stern
 Metalux
 Need New Body
 Nervous Cop
 No-Neck Blues Band
 The Punks
 The Robot Ate Me
 The Seconds
 Slim Moon and What Army
 The Planet The
 Voltage
 Wooden Wand and the Vanishing Voice
 Xiu Xiu

Left 5 Rue Christine
 The Get Hustle
 Out Hud
 Rob Fisk
 XBXRX
 Young People

Disbanded
 Godzik Pink
 Men's Recovery Project
 Replikants
 Schema
 Semiautomatic
 Witchypoo

See also
 List of record labels
 Kill Rock Stars

External links
 Kill Rock Stars

References

Kill Rock Stars
American independent record labels
Record labels established in 1997
Experimental music record labels
Companies based in Olympia, Washington